Lung Yeuk Tau, commonly known as Lung Ku Tau and also called Lung Ling is an area located northeast of Luen Wo Hui in Fanling, New Territories, Hong Kong.

Administration
For electoral purposes, Lung Yeuk Tau is part of the Queen's Hill constituency of the North District Council. It is currently represented by Law Ting-tak, who was elected in the local elections.

Lung Yeuk Tau (including San Uk Tsuen, San Wai, Wing Ning Tsuen, Wing Ning Wai, Ma Wat Tsuen, Tung Kok Wai and Lo Wai) forms collectively a recognized village under the New Territories Small House Policy.

Villages
Lung Yeuk Tau is home to the Five Wais (walled villages) and Six Tsuens (villages) of the Tang Clan.
The "Five Wais" are:
 Lo Wai
 Ma Wat Wai
 San Wai, also called Kun Lung Wai
 Tung Kok Wai, also known as Ling Kok Wai
 Wing Ning Wai

The "Six Tsuen" are:
 Kun Lung Tsuen
 Ma Wat Tsuen
 San Uk Tsuen
 Siu Hang Tsuen
 Tsz Tong Tsuen
 Wing Ning Tsuen, also called Tai Tang

History
Lung Yeuk Tau was served by the Lung Yeuk Tau station of the former Sha Tau Kok Railway, which was in operation from 1911 to 1928. Lung Yeuk Tau station was opened on 21 December 1911.

Heritage Trail
The area is home to several declared monuments and walled villages. The Lung Yeuk Tau Heritage Trail has been established to promote and facilitate the visit of some of the historical places of the area. Places along the Heritage Trail include:

See also
 Heritage trails in Hong Kong
 Ping Shan Heritage Trail, in Yuen Long District
 Fan Leng Lau

References

Further reading
 
 
 (about a Christian Hakka community in Shung Him Tong Tsuen)

External links

 Delineation of area of existing village Lung Yeuk Tau (Fanling) for election of resident representative (2019 to 2022)
 Antiquities and Monuments Office. Yeuk Tau Heritage Trail webpage
 Antiquities and Monuments Office. Yeuk Tau Heritage Trail booklet (2015)
 Antiquities and Monuments Office. Hong Kong Traditional Chinese Architectural Information System. San Uk Tsuen
 Antiquities and Monuments Office. Hong Kong Traditional Chinese Architectural Information System. Wing Ning Tsuen